The Second Federal Electoral District of Colima (II Distrito Electoral Federal de Colima) is one of the 300 Electoral Districts into which Mexico is divided for the purpose of elections to the federal Chamber of Deputies and one of two such districts in the state of Colima.

It elects one deputy to the lower house of Congress for each three-year legislative period, by means of the first past the post system.

District territory
Under the 2005 districting scheme, the Second  District of Colima covers the municipalities in the south  and west part of the state: Armería, Manzanillo, Minatitlán and Tecomán.

The district's head town (cabecera distrital), where results from individual polling stations are gathered together and collated, is the city of Manzanillo.

Previous districting schemes

1996–2005 district
Between 1996 and 2005, the district had the same composition as at present, with the exception that it also covered Ixtlahuacán, which was transferred to the First District in 2005.

Deputies returned to Congress from this district

LI Legislature
 1976–1979: Fernando Moreno Peña (PRI)
LI Legislature
 1979–1982: Arnoldo Ochoa González (PRI)
LII Legislature
 1982–1985:
LIII Legislature
 1985–1988:
LIV Legislature
 1988–1991: Juan Mesina Alatorre (PRI)
LV Legislature
 1991–1994:
LVI Legislature
 1994–1997: Cecilio Lepe Bautista (PRI)
LVII Legislature
 1997–2000: Librado Silva García (PRI)
LVIII Legislature
 2000–2003: Roberto Preciado Cuevas (PRI)
LIX Legislature
 2003–2006: Rogelio Rueda Sánchez (PRI)
LX Legislature
 2006–2009: Nabor Ochoa López (PAN)

References 

Federal electoral districts of Mexico
Politics of Colima